308th Division or 308th Infantry Division may refer to:

 308th Rifle Division (Soviet Union)
 308th Infantry Division (Vietnam)